Antonio Sandini  (30 June 1692 – 23 February 1751, Padua, Italy) was an Italian ecclesiastical historian.
 
Through the interest of his bishop, cardinal Rezzonico (later pope Clement XIII), Sandini became a librarian and professor of ecclesiastical history at Padua. He is known principally by his Vitae Pontificum Romanorum (Ferrara, 1748; reprinted under the title Basis Historiae Ecclesiasticae). He also wrote Historiae Familiae Sacrae, Hist. SS. Apostolorum, Disputationes XX ex. Hist. Eccles., and Dissertations in Defence of his Hist. Fam. Sac.

Bibliography 

1692 births
1751 deaths
18th-century Italian historians
Italian librarians